William Stafford may refer to:

Courtiers
 William Stafford (courtier) (c. 1500–1556), courtier to Henry VIII and Edward VI of England; husband of Mary Boleyn
 William Stafford (conspirator) (1554–1612), courtier and conspirator
 William Howard, 1st Viscount Stafford (1614–1680), British nobleman and Roman Catholic martyr
 William Stafford, 4th Earl of Stafford (1375–1395)

Politicians
 William Stafford (MP) (1627–1665), MP for Stamford
 William H. Stafford (1869–1957), United States Representative for Wisconsin
 Will Stafford (1837–1884), one of founders of the nineteenth century UK labour movement

Others
 William Stafford (British soldier) (1854–1952), played in 1875 FA Cup Final and 1873–74 Home Nations rugby union match
 William Stafford (died 1450) of Southwick, Wiltshire
 William Stafford (author) (1593–1684), British author
 William Stafford (poet) (1914–1993), American poet
 William Henry Stafford Jr. (born 1931), United States federal judge
 William Stafford (mining engineer) (1842–1907), Scottish coal mining engineer responsible for the location of Lethbridge, Canada
 William Josephus Stafford (1781–1823), sea captain and privateer during the War of 1812 and afterward
 Billy Stafford from A Ticket to Red Horse Gulch

See also

 Bill Stafford (1939–2001), American baseball player
 Stafford (surname)
 
 William Stafford-Howard (disambiguation)
 Stafford (disambiguation)
 William (disambiguation)